Koch Deng Aguer Bar (born 16 September 1996) is a South Sudanese basketball player who plays for Horsens IC and the South Sudan national basketball team. Bar played four seasons of college basketball with Bradley.

College career
Bar averaged 6.0 points, 5.3 rebounds and 1.2 blocks as a freshman. He was named to the Missouri Valley Conference All-Freshman Team. Bar averaged 5.7 points, and 4.3 rebounds per game as a junior. As a senior at Bradley, Bar averaged 6.2 points and 7.1 rebounds per game.

Professional career
In May 2020, Bar signed his first professional contract with Værløse Blue Hawks of the Danish Basketligaen. In his rookie year, he averaged 14.5 points and a league second-best 10.4 rebounds per game.

For the 2021–22 season, Bar signed with Danish side Horsens IC.

National team career
Internationally, Bar has played for the South Sudan national basketball team. He played with South Sudan at AfroBasket 2021, where he contributed 4 points per game off the bench, helping the team reach the quarterfinals in its first major tournament.

References

External links
Bradley Braves bio
Koch Bar at Eurobasket
Koch Bar at RealGM

1996 births
Værløse BBK players
Horsens IC players
Living people
Centers (basketball)
Bradley Braves men's basketball players
South Sudanese men's basketball players